In public services, automatic enrolment defines programmes where citizens are automatically included unless they opt out. 

Examples include:
Pensions in the United Kingdom as of 2012
Organ donation in some countries such as Austria

Benefits and drawbacks
Automatic enrolment is recommended in the book Nudge by Thaler and Sunstein, as it promotes higher participation rates than when citizens are left to arrange their own pensions.

Libertarians argue against automatic enrolment as it impinges on an individual's freedom of choice.

References

External links
https://web.archive.org/web/20161118041846/https://naeh.co.uk/ National Auto Enrolment Helpline
Behavioral economics